The Musashino Stakes (Japanese 武蔵野ステークス) is a Grade 3 horse race for Thoroughbreds aged three and over, run in November over a distance of 1600 metres on dirt at Tokyo Racecourse.

It was first run in 1989 and has held Grade 3 status since 1996. It was run over a distance of 2100 metres from 1996 to 1999. The raceservesa trial for the Champions Cup.

Winners since 2000 

 The 2002 race took place at Nakayama Racecourse over a distance of 1800 metres.

Earlier winners

 1989 - Rainbow Akasaka
 1990 - Dyna Letter
 1991 - Mr Tojin
 1992 - Narita Hayabusa
 1993 - Meisho Homura
 1994 - Ibuki Crush
 1995 - Ibuki Crush
 1996 - Shinko King
 1997 - Duke Grand Prix
 1998 - M I Blanc
 1999 - M I Blanc

See also
 Horse racing in Japan
 List of Japanese flat horse races

References

Dirt races in Japan